Dichomeris tenextrema is a moth in the family Gelechiidae. It was described by Hou-Hun Li, Hui Zhen and Wolfram Mey in 2013. It is found in Kenya.

The wingspan is about 12.5 mm. The basal two-fifths of the forewings is dark brown and the distal three-fifths greyish brown. There is a yellow spot at the distal one-third of the costal margin and an inconspicuous dark brown fascia from the costal three-fourths to near the tornus. The hindwings are greyish brown.

Etymology
The specific name refers to the gnathos abruptly narrowed to sharp apex and is derived from Latin tenu- (meaning narrowed) and extremus (meaning apical).

References

Moths described in 2013
tenextrema